Mount Tell is an unincorporated community in Jackson County, West Virginia, United States.

References 

Unincorporated communities in West Virginia
Unincorporated communities in Jackson County, West Virginia